Phi Kappa Psi, also called "Phi Psi," is an American collegiate social fraternity founded at Jefferson College in Canonsburg, Pennsylvania on February 19, 1852.  There are over a hundred chapters and colonies at accredited four year colleges and universities throughout the United States.

Phi Kappa Psi's first form of government centered on a Grand Chapter.  One chapter at a time was designated the Grand Chapter, and it was responsible for governing the national fraternity.  This lasted until 1886 when a new constitution changed to the current form of government.

In 1992, Phi Kappa Psi began to award one exceptional chapter with the Grand Chapter Award.  Its name is derived from the fraternity's first form of government. This award was initially granted biennially at Grand Arch Councils.  2001 marked the first time that this award was granted in an odd-numbered year, and it has been an annual award ever since.

Grand Chapters

Grand Chapter Award winners

Footnotes

References

External links

Phi Kappa Psi's official web site

Phi Kappa Psi